The 1982–83 Divizia B was the 43rd season of the second tier of the Romanian football league system.

The format has been maintained to three series, each of them having 18 teams. At the end of the season the winners of the series promoted to Divizia A and the last four places from each series relegated to Divizia C.

Team changes

To Divizia B
Promoted from Divizia C
 Minerul Gura Humorului
 Borzești
 Prahova Ploiești
 Metalosport Galați
 Dinamo Victoria București
 Rova Roșiori
 Minerul Motru
 Metalurgistul Cugir
 Gloria Reșița
 Armătura Zalău
 IS Câmpia Turzii
 Precizia Săcele

Relegated from Divizia A
 Universitatea Cluj
 UTA Arad
 Progresul Vulcan București

From Divizia B
Relegated to Divizia C
 CSU Galați
 Flacăra-Automecanica Moreni
 Dacia Orăștie
 Constructorul Iași
 Metalul Plopeni
 Minerul Lupeni
 Victoria Tecuci
 Tractorul Brașov
 CFR Cluj
 Relonul Săvinești
 ICIM Brașov
 Minerul Ilba-Seini

Promoted to Divizia A
 Politehnica Iași
 Petrolul Ploiești
 Bihor Oradea

Renamed teams
Energia Slatina was renamed as IP Aluminiu Slatina.

FCM Reșița was renamed as CSM Reșița.

Mecanică Fină București was renamed as Mecanică Fină Steaua București.

Viitorul Vaslui was renamed as Viitorul Mecanica Vaslui.

Other teams
FCM Galați and CSU Galați merged, the second one being absorbed by the first one. After the merge FCM Galați was renamed as Dunărea CSU Galați.

League tables

Serie I

Serie II

Serie III

See also 
 1982–83 Divizia A
 1982–83 Divizia C
 1982–83 Cupa României

References

Liga II seasons
Romania
2